Clement Archer (21 December 1748 - 1803) was a surgeon and president of the Royal College of Surgeons in Ireland.

Clement Archer was born in the County of Wexford on 21 December 1748. He was educated as a surgeon, and on 4 February 1772, was examined by the County Infirmaries' Board, and "passed" for the Longford Infirmary.

He settled in Dublin in 1774, and was an original member of the Surgeons' Society. In 1785 he, together with surgeons Bolger, Lindsay, Costelloe, Hartigan, and Graydon, and Drs. Brereton, Percival, Dickson, Kennedy, Bell, and Boyton, founded the Dublin General Dispensary in the old Post Office yard, Temple-bar, the treasurer being Sir William Newcomen.

In 1797 Archer became Assistant-Surgeon to Steevens' Hospital. He succeeded Whiteway as Surgeon of the Foundlings' Hospital. He was perhaps the first medical man in Ireland who practised medical electricity. He was a member of the Dublin Medico-Philosophic Society. In 1789 Archer was elected the first Professor of Pharmacy in RCSI. In 1791 he was appointed State Surgeon.

Clement Archer was the President of the Royal College of Surgeons in Ireland (RCSI) in 1795.

References 

Presidents of the Royal College of Surgeons in Ireland
Irish surgeons
1748 births
1803 deaths
Irish health officials